Camille Petit (2 April 1912 – 2 August 1993) was a French politician from Saint-Esprit, Martinique.

Biography

Medical career and public health practice 
Petit was a doctor by profession. After completing his studies at the Faculty of Medicine in Paris in 1938, he worked in a hospital in Fort-de-France and others in Paris. He was involved in setting up Martinique's "" (the drop of milk) project with the Union des Femmes de la Martinique (Women's Union of Martinique), which worked to give mothers access to more information about nutrition for babies.

Political career 
In his political career, he pioneered the Gaullist movement in Martinique. In 1958, he participated in the official creation of the Union for the New Republic (UNR) of Martinique, a political party, he became departmental secretary from 1958 to 1965. From its creation, the UNR of Martinique fiercely defended the complete assimilation of Martinique to France and the status of an overseas department.

He was a great admirer of General de Gaulle and a convinced assimilationist, opposing Martinique's autonomists, who were in favor of Martinique's separation from France. Throughout his political career, he demonstrated an unwavering attachment to the French nation and to republican values.

The history society established itself as an organisation which overcame the political, as can be seen in its offering interest to such differing personalities as Petit and his fellow society member, Aimé Césaire.

Mayor of Sainte-Marie 
A longstanding mayor of Sainte-Marie, he oversaw a number of developments in the town between 1967 and 1983. Sainte Marie's housing stock was extensively rebuilt, gaining a new quarter (Villeneuve), several schools, market buildings, a medical and educational centre, town hall and stadium. He also arranged for the allocation of a plot of land to the SICA de Fonds Saint Jacques, which is now a historic site and cultural centre.

On 15 April 1982, he was re-elected president of the Regional Council of Martinique. He did not participate in the 1983 French municipal elections. Petit died at the age of 81 in Paris, after an illness; he is buried in the cemetery of Bagneux. He is the grandfather of Maud Petit, member of the French National Assembly representing Val-de-Marne.

Terms of office

Local government 

 1953 - 1959 : City councillor of Fort-de-France
 1959 - 1965 : Mayor of Grand'Rivière
  February 1969 -  March 1983: Mayor of Sainte-Marie
 1955 - 1959 : General councillor of the canton of Grand'Rivière
 1959 - 1967 : General councillor of Fort-de-France 1st canton
 1974 - 1983 : President of the Regional Council of Martinique

Parliamentary terms 

  March 1967 -  May 1968 : Deputy of Martinique's 1st constituency
  June 1968 -  April 1973: Deputy of Martinique's 1st constituency
  March 1973 -  April 1978: Deputy of Martinique's 1st constituency
  March 1978 -  May 1981: Deputy of Martinique's 1st constituency
  June 1981 -  April 1986: Deputy of Martinique's 1st constituency

References 

Presidents of French regions and overseas collectivities
Union of Democrats for the Republic politicians
Union for the New Republic politicians
Deputies of the 7th National Assembly of the French Fifth Republic
Deputies of the 6th National Assembly of the French Fifth Republic
Deputies of the 5th National Assembly of the French Fifth Republic
Deputies of the 4th National Assembly of the French Fifth Republic
Deputies of the 3rd National Assembly of the French Fifth Republic
1912 births
1993 deaths

Deaths in Paris

Martiniquais politicians

Gaullists
20th-century French physicians
French public health doctors
Martiniquais physicians